{{DISPLAYTITLE:C18H36O2}}
The molecular formula C18H36O2 (molar mass: 284.48 g/mol, exact mass: 284.2715 u) may refer to:

 Ethyl palmitate
 Stearic acid